William Robert Johnston Municipal Airport  is a city-owned public-use airport located in Mendota, a city in Fresno County, California, United States. This airport is included in the National Plan of Integrated Airport Systems for 2011–2015, which categorized it as a general aviation facility. It was known as Mendota Airport until 2008.

Facilities and aircraft 
William Robert Johnston Municipal Airport covers an area of 130 acres (53 ha) at an elevation of 162 feet (49 m) above mean sea level. It has one runway designated 15/33 with an asphalt surface measuring 3,499 by 50 feet (1,066 x 15 m). For the 12-month period ending July 28, 2011, the airport had 4,000 general aviation aircraft operations, an average of 10 per day.

References

External links 

 USGS aerial image

Airports in Fresno County, California